Red Sucker Lake is a lake in the northeastern part of Manitoba, Canada, near its border with Ontario. Adjacent to the lake is the Red Sucker Lake First Nation and the community of Red Sucker Lake, Manitoba.

References

Lakes of Northern Manitoba
Island Lake Region, Manitoba